The GB4 Championship is a single seater motorsport series based in the United Kingdom. The championship is operated by MotorSport Vision with support from the BRDC, and is aimed at young drivers graduating from karting or club level motorsport such as Formula Ford. The championship was announced in September 2021 and the first season started at Snetterton in April 2022.

History
The championship was launched in September 2021, and is designed to be a low-cost alternative to Formula 4 championships. A total of 12 teams have stated intentions to race in the first season.

The Tatuus F4-T014 car will be used by all competitors, and operated by teams or the competitors themselves. All cars will be powered by Abarth engines and use Pirelli tyres.

The first round of the inaugural season took place at Snetterton Circuit on 2 April 2022, with the first winner being Nikolas Taylor driving for Fortec Motorsports.

Car
The GB4 Championship uses the Tatuus F4-T014 car previously used by the Italian, ADAC, Spanish and other F4 championships across Europe.

The engine is an Abarth-branded, turbocharged Autotecnica Motori 1.4L FTJ I4 and produces 160hp. It features a sequential six-speed gearbox developed by Sadev and Magneti Marelli electronics.

Points system
Points are awarded to the top 20 classified finishers in races one and two, with the third race awarding points to only the top 15. Race three, which has its grid formed by reversing the qualifying order, awards extra points for positions gained from the drivers' respective starting positions.

Champions

Circuits

References 

 
Formula racing series
Auto racing series in the United Kingdom
2022 establishments in the United Kingdom
Recurring sporting events established in 2022
Formula 4 series